Rosenwasser is a surname, meaning "rose water" in the German language. Notable people named Rosenwasser include:

Anna Rosenwasser (1990), Swiss journalist, editorialist, and political and pro-LGBTQ-activist
Dara Rosenwasser (1974), American artist, educator, creative Producer and director

Jewish surnames
German-language surnames
Yiddish-language surnames
Surnames from ornamental names